Carlos Cortés Vargas (1883-1954) was a Colombian general, most noted for ordering the Santa Marta massacre in response to a strike of United Fruit workers in 1928. Cortes took responsibility for 47 casualties, but the exact number of casualties will probably never be known. Herrera Soto, co-author of the most comprehensive and detailed study of the 1928 strike, has put together the various estimates given by contemporaries and historians, ranging from 47 to 2,000.

General Cortes, who issued the order to shoot, argued later that he had issued the order because he had information that American boats were poised to land troops on Colombian coasts to defend American personnel and the interests of the United Fruit Company. Cortes issued the order so the US would not invade Colombia. This position was strongly criticized in the Senate, especially by Jorge Eliécer Gaitán, who argued that those same bullets should have been used to stop the foreign invader.

References 

1883 births
1954 deaths
Colombian generals